Poorna Charuka (born 24 March 1997) is a Sri Lankan cricketer. He made his Twenty20 debut for Lankan Cricket Club in the 2017–18 SLC Twenty20 Tournament on 24 February 2018. He made his List A debut for Lankan Cricket Club in the 2017–18 Premier Limited Overs Tournament on 18 March 2018.

References

External links
 

1997 births
Living people
Sri Lankan cricketers
Lankan Cricket Club cricketers